Svet v ohrození (which translates to The World in Danger) is the eleventh studio album by the Slovak rock band Tublatanka, released on 17 May 2010.

Track listing
 "Svet v ohrození" (Maťo Ďurinda, Mirka Ďurindová) - 6:02
 "Revolúcia" (Maťo Ďurinda) - 4:48
 "Pekelný vlak" (Maťo Ďurinda, Mirka Ďurindová) - 5:52
 "Lietam vo výškach" (Maťo Ďurinda, Mirka Ďurindová) - 5:26
 "Svätý Grál" (Maťo Ďurinda, Mirka Ďurindová) - 4:57
 "Zmysel lásky" (Maťo Ďurinda, Mirka Ďurindová) - 4:35
 "Malý blázon" (Maťo Ďurinda) - 3:56
 "Stratený svet" (Maťo Ďurinda, Mirka Ďurindová) - 5:39
 "Šlabikár IX" (Maťo Ďurinda, Martin Sarvaš) - 4:59
 "Môj domov" (Mirka Ďurindová)  - 4:52
 "Dobrá správa" (Juraj Topor, Martin Sarvaš)  - 3:52
 "Nechaj to tak" (Maťo Ďurinda, Mirka Ďurindová) - 4:05
 "Stres" (Maťo Ďurinda) - 4:16
 "S tebou anjel môj" (Maťo Ďurinda, Mirka Ďurindová) - 4:34

Credits
 Maťo Ďurinda - lead vocals, guitar, piano
 Juraj Topor - bass guitar
 Peter Schlosser - drums

References

Tublatanka albums
2010 albums